Félicien Van De Putte (born 1898, date of death unknown) was a Belgian long-distance runner. He competed in the marathon at the 1924 Summer Olympics.

References

External links
 

1898 births
Year of death missing
Athletes (track and field) at the 1924 Summer Olympics
Belgian male long-distance runners
Belgian male marathon runners
Olympic athletes of Belgium